Saint Mary's School, commonly known as Saints, is a private Roman Catholic primary and secondary day school for boys located in Nairobi, Kenya.

Administered by the Roman Catholic Archdiocese of Nairobi, the school offers KCPE, KCSE, IGCSE and IBDP certification. The school admits female students for the IB Diploma Programme.

The school's motto is "Bonitas, Disciplina, Scientia", which is Latin for "Goodness, Discipline, Knowledge".

History

St. Mary's School was founded in 1939 in the Parklands area of Nairobi, from Blackrock College in Dublin, Ireland.

In September 1945, the school was moved to a temporary structure on an  site on the land belonging to the St. Austin's Mission in the Muthangari area of Westlands. The present-day school buildings were completed in 1954, including the twin towers that stand at the school's quadrangle and the older St. Austin's Catholic Church, which sits beside the school's parking area. In between the towers is the staff room where teachers convene for meetings and take their breaks, which used to be the school's library.

Present day
From the outset, Saints has always had a combined primary and secondary school. Although only boys are admitted to the primary and secondary schools, girls (along with boys) are admitted to the International Baccalaureate diploma course which is a post-O-level programme offered by the school since 1982. Entrants are chosen on the basis of their KCSE and IGCSE results. The school year runs from January to November.

Students are encouraged to participate in extra-curricular activities, which include sports, clubs, music and drama. All the school's sports teams are nicknamed "Saints", also the school's nickname.

Theatre
Since 1971, the school has been staging a musical every year, open to the general public. The musical week runs on specific dates from Tuesday to Saturday. The school has staged its own productions of famous plays such as The Mikado, The Yeomen of the Guard, The King and I, Joseph and the Amazing Technicolor Dreamcoat, The Sound of Music, Sarafina!, Cinderella,  Oklahoma!, The Music Man, Ipi N'tombi, Aida, Zambezi Express, Amazing Grace (the musical).

Notable guests who have attended the school's shows in the past include former Prime Minister of Kenya Raila Odinga.

Principals
 Fr. Laurence Murren (1939)
 Fr. Kevin Devenish (1939–1941)
 Fr. Thomas O'Sullivan (1941–1948)
 Fr. James Kavanagh (1949–1950)
 Fr. James Barrett (1951–1953)
 Fr. John Horgan (1954–1956)
 Fr. Paul Cunningham (1956–1968)
 Fr. Thomas Farrelly (1968–1970)
 Fr. Oliver Ellis (1971–1977)
 Fr. Michael Malone (1977–1980)
 Fr. Sean O'Connell (1980–1982)
 Fr. Cormac O'Brolchain (1982–1984)
 Fr. Eddie O'Farrell (1984-1990)
 Fr. Thomas Hogan (1990–1995)
 Fr. John McMahon (1996–2002)
 Mr. Simon Otieno (2003–2005)
 Fr. Boniface Kariuki (2006–2010)
 Fr. Francis Mburu (2011–2014)
 Br. Moses Wafula (2015–2016)
 Mr. Benedict Otieno (2016–2018)
 Mr. Peter M. Macharia (2019–present)

Notable alumni

Ian Duncan, rally driver
John Githongo, anti-corruption journalist
Muhoho Kenyatta, Kenyan businessman
Uhuru Kenyatta, 4th President of Kenya
Jeff Koinange, journalist and news anchor
Gideon Moi, senator for Baringo County
Lupita Nyong'o, award-winning actress and film director
Mohammad Sheikh, former Kenyan international cricketer
Eric Wainaina, Kenyan singer-songwriter
Jimmy Wanjigi, Kenyan businessman

References

External links
 

Schools in Nairobi
International Baccalaureate schools in Kenya
Educational institutions established in 1939
Catholic primary schools in Kenya
Catholic secondary schools in Kenya
Spiritan schools
1939 establishments in Kenya